Bárbara Malda Salinas (born 12 May 1984 in Bilbao) is a Spanish field hockey player who competed in the 2004 Summer Olympics and in the 2008 Summer Olympics.

References

External links
 

1984 births
Living people
Spanish female field hockey players
Olympic field hockey players of Spain
Field hockey players at the 2004 Summer Olympics
Field hockey players at the 2008 Summer Olympics
Sportspeople from Bilbao
Field hockey players from the Basque Country (autonomous community)